Comatacta is a genus of bristle flies in the family Tachinidae.

Species
Comatacta insularis Curran, 1927
Comatacta micropalpus (Curran, 1925)
Comatacta nautlana Townsend, 1908
Comatacta tricincta (Fabricius, 1805)
Comatacta variegata (Fabricius, 1805)

References

Diptera of North America
Diptera of South America
Dexiinae
Tachinidae genera
Taxa named by Daniel William Coquillett